Acco was a chief of the Senones in Gaul, who induced his countrymen to revolt against Julius Caesar in 53 BC.  On the conclusion of the war, and after a conference at Durocortorum, Caesar had Acco tried and convicted on charges of treason.  As punishment, he was flogged to death in the full sight of the other leaders of that people.

References 

Barbarian people of the Gallic Wars
Celtic warriors
Gaulish rulers
Celts
53 BC deaths
Senones
1st-century BC rulers in Europe
Year of birth unknown